Anton Graf Grassalkovich (Ürmény, 6 March 1694 – Gödöllő, 1 December 1771) was an Imperial Real Privy Councilor, President of the Royal Hungarian Court Chamber, Chief Justice of Hungary (1731–1748), and confidant of Empress Maria Theresia.

Biography 
Anton (Antal I) Grassalkovich came from a Slovak family of Croatian descent from the lower nobility in Beckov.

Grassalkovich was appointed Royal Prosecutor (Causarum Regalium Director) in 1720 and Chief Justice of Hungary (Personalis) in 1731. On 26 May 1732, he was made a Baron. He gave up the office of Advocate General when he succeeded Count Erdődy as President of the Hungarian Court Chamber in 1748, a position he held until his death. On 5 April 1743, he was raised to the rank of Count.

The Grassalkovich era was characterized by the Court Chamber's systematic efforts to organize the immigration of people willing to settle beyond the western borders of the Holy Roman Empire to colonize large parts of what was then Hungary. In connection with this, Grassalkovich acquired extensive estates in the Pest district and, in implementing these plans, rose from humble beginnings to become one of the richest men in Hungary. In the second half of the 18th century, Grassalkovich largely shaped the settlement and colonization policy of the Habsburg Empress Maria Theresia, of which he became a trusted advisor.

He had the Grassalkovich Palace in Bratislava built in 1760, as an impressive Rococo/Late Baroque summer palace with a French garden. The palace followed the model of the Royal Palace of Gödöllő, which was also built for Grassalkovich. Upon its completion, the Grassalkovich Palace was the focal point of the city's baroque music. Count Grassalkovich had his own orchestra, and his close relative Nikolaus I, Prince Esterházy, often sent him his personal composer Joseph Haydn, who premiered some of his works here. Numerous balls and festivities of the imperial court were also held in the palace.

Grassalkovich was depicted on the Maria-Theresia Memorial, as one of her most important administrators.

Marriage and Children  
Grassalkovich married 3 times and had 5 children including,
 Anton (Antal) II Grassalkovich (1734–1794), married Anna Maria Gräfin Esterhazy von Galantha.
 Maria Anna (1760–1815), married Mihály Viczay

His only surviving grandson, Anton (Antal) III Grassalkovich (1771–1841), died without children.

See also 
 Danube Swabians

Sources 
 Grassalkovich Antal 
 Genealogy
 Opac nevter
 German Wikipedia

1694 births
1771 deaths
Hungarian nobility
18th-century Hungarian people
People from Nitra District